Challis is the largest city in Custer County, Idaho, United States. It is the county seat and its population was 1,081 at the 2010 census. The 2020 census shows 902 residents, a 16.6% drop.

History
Challis was founded in 1878 and named for A.P. Challis, who was a surveyor when the townsite was laid out. Challis post office was established in 1878.

Twin Peaks Sports, the I.O.O.F. Hall, and a number of other buildings in Challis are individually listed on the National Register of Historic Places, most as a result of an Idaho State Historical Society study of historical resources in the town.

Highways
 - US 93 - to Salmon (north) and Mackay (south)
 - to Stanley (southwest)

The Salmon River Scenic Byway uses both highways, from Stanley to Salmon. The junction with Highway 75 is south of Challis.

1983 earthquake
On Friday, October 28, 1983, the Borah Peak earthquake occurred at 8:06 am MDT. The shock measured 6.9 on the moment magnitude scale and had a maximum Mercalli intensity of IX (Violent). The Challis-Mackay region experienced rather thorough damage, with 11 commercial buildings and 39 homes with major damage; while another 200 houses were damaged, minor to moderately. Most of the city's large buildings on its Main Street were damaged, to some extent; eight of these buildings were deemed condemned and closed down. Most of these buildings were built from materials such as brick, concrete block, and stone, each varying. The two fatalities of the earthquake were in Challis; a store front fell on two children walking to school.

2020 earthquake 

This was the second strongest earthquake in the state of Idaho ever recorded.

Geography and climate

Challis experiences a semi-arid climate (Köppen climate classification BSk) with cold winters, hot summers, and low precipitation throughout the year.

Demographics

2010 census
At the 2010 census there were 1,081 people, 502 households, and 277 families living in the city. The racial makeup of the city was 93.6% White, 0.1% African American, 0.8% Native American, 0.3% Asian, 3.5% from other races, and 1.7% from two or more races. Hispanic or Latino of any race were 7.2%.

Of the 502 households 26.7% had children under the age of 18 living with them, 43.4% were married couples living together, 7.2% had a female householder with no husband present, 4.6% had a male householder with no wife present, and 44.8% were non-families. 39.0% of households were one person and 15.6% were one person aged 65 or older. The average household size was 2.14 and the average family size was 2.84.

The median age was 42 years. 21.3% of residents were under the age of 18; 6.7% were between the ages of 18 and 24; 26.3% were from 25 to 44; 28.5% were from 45 to 64; and 17.2% were 65 or older. The gender makeup of the city was 55.0% male and 45.0% female.

2000 census
At the 2000 census there were 909 people, 410 households, and 248 families living in the city. The racial makeup of the city was 97.14% White, 0.88% Native American, 1.21% from other races, and 0.77% from two or more races. Hispanic or Latino of any race were 3.85%.

Of the 410 households 29.0% had children under the age of 18 living with them, 52.4% were married couples living together, 5.1% had a female householder with no husband present, and 39.3% were non-families. 35.6% of households were one person and 17.6% were one person aged 65 or older.  The average household size was 2.21 and the average family size was 2.90.

The age distribution was 25.0% under the age of 18, 4.7% from 18 to 24, 26.0% from 25 to 44, 24.9% from 45 to 64, and 19.5% 65 or older.  The median age was 42 years. For every 100 females, there were 98.0 males.  For every 100 females age 18 and over, there were 94.3 males.

The median household income was $29,904 and the median family income  was $39,444. Males had a median income of $38,250 versus $21,964 for females. The per capita income for the city was $15,803.  About 8.5% of families and 12.7% of the population were below the poverty line, including 8.2% of those under age 18 and 18.5% of those age 65 or over.

Notable people 

 Lawrence Henry Chamberlain (1906–1989), dean of Columbia College and vice president of Columbia University

References

External links
Challis Chamber of Commerce
Challis Idaho.com - community site
Challis School District #181

Cities in Idaho
Cities in Custer County, Idaho
County seats in Idaho
Populated places established in 1878